Knappa is an unincorporated community and census-designated place located on the south bank of the Columbia River in Clatsop County, Oregon, United States, approximately  directly east of Astoria. Knappa faces the Columbia River, where several islands comprise the Lewis and Clark National Wildlife Refuge.

The community is named after Aaron Knapp Jr., an early settler. There was a post office in Knappa from 1872 to 1943. It is vulnerable to a Cascadia Subduction Zone tsunami.

Logging and fishing are the primary economic activities in Knappa. Knappa School District comprises Hilda Lahti Elementary School and Knappa High School.

Demographics

References 

Unincorporated communities in Clatsop County, Oregon
Unincorporated communities in Oregon
Census-designated places in Clatsop County, Oregon
Census-designated places in Oregon
1872 establishments in Oregon
Populated places established in 1872
Oregon populated places on the Columbia River